39th Regiment may refer to:

Infantry regiments
 2/39 Evzone Regiment, Greece
 The Garhwal Rifles (39th Garhwal Rifles), a unit of both the British Indian Army, and the present Indian Army 
 39th (Dorsetshire) Regiment of Foot, a unit of the British Army
 39th Infantry Regiment (United States), a unit of the United States Army

Cavalry regiments
 Central India Horse (21st King George V's Own Horse) (39th Regiment Central India Horse), a unit of the British Indian Army

Engineering regiments
 39 Engineer Regiment (United Kingdom), a unit of the British Army's Royal Engineers

Artillery regiments
 39th Regiment Royal Artillery, a unit of the United Kingdom Army

American Civil War units
 39th Illinois Volunteer Infantry Regiment, a unit of the Union (Northern) Army
 39th Iowa Volunteer Infantry Regiment, a unit of the Union (Northern) Army
 39th New Jersey Volunteer Infantry, a unit of the Union (Northern) Army
 39th New York Volunteer Infantry Regiment, a unit of the Union (Northern) Army
 39th Wisconsin Volunteer Infantry Regiment, a unit of the Union (Northern) Army
 39th United States Infantry, a unit of the Union (Northern) Army

See also
 39th Division (disambiguation)
 39th Brigade (disambiguation)
 39th Battalion (disambiguation)
 39th Squadron (disambiguation)